Switzerland boycotted the 1956 Summer Olympics in Melbourne, Australia because of the Soviet Union's invasion of Hungary.  However, the equestrian events were held in Stockholm, Sweden earlier in the year because of the Australian quarantine laws.  The Swiss team competed in Stockholm, winning a bronze medal.

Equestrian

Dressage

Eventing

Show jumping

References
 
International Olympic Committee results database

Nations at the 1956 Summer Olympics
1956
1956 in Swiss sport